The M898 motorway is a  motorway in Renfrewshire, Scotland. It is a spur route from the M8 motorway towards the Erskine Bridge.  It lacks hard shoulders along its length. Its northern terminus comes at the junction with the A726 road, the former location of the toll booths for the Erskine Bridge, which were removed on 1 April 2006.

Junctions
{| class="plainrowheaders wikitable"
|-
!scope=col|County
!scope=col|Location
!scope=col|mi
!scope=col|km
!scope=col|Junction
!scope=col|Destinations
!scope=col|Notes
|-
|rowspan="2"|Renfrewshire
|rowspan="2"|Erskine
|0
|0
|—
|  - Glasgow, Glasgow Airport, Greenock
|
|-
|1.0
|1.6
|1
|  - Erskine Bridge  - Erskine, Inchinnan
|End of motorway; continues as A898

Coordinate list

References

External links

Glasgow Motorway Archive - The M898 Motorway
 CBRD Motorway Database – M898
 Pathetic Motorways – M898

Motorways in Scotland
Transport in Renfrewshire
Erskine, Renfrewshire